Ticengo is a comune (municipality) in the Province of Cremona in the Italian region Lombardy, located about  east of Milan and about  northwest of Cremona.

Ticengo borders the following municipalities: Casaletto di Sopra, Cumignano sul Naviglio, Romanengo, Salvirola, Soncino.

References

External links
Official website

Cities and towns in Lombardy